Pastiches et mélanges is a collection of accounts of the Lemoine case by Marcel Proust, as recounted in the style of sundry classical french authors (namely Balzac, Flaubert, Sainte-Beuve, Henri de Régnier, Michelet, Faguet, Renan and Saint-Simon) ; it was released in 1919.
The compilation has 277 pages.

References

External links
 

1919 books
French-language books
French books
Pastiches et melanges